Amoli: Priceless is a 2018 documentary film on commercial sexual exploitation of children. The film is directed by National Award-winning directors Jasmine Kaur Roy and Avinash Roy and produced by Culture Machine. The music was scored by Tajdar Junaid. The film was released in May 2018.

Rajkummar Rao (Hindi), Sachin Khedekar (Marathi), Kamal Haasan (Tamil), Vidya Balan (English), Nani (Telugu), Jisshu Sengupta (Bengali) and Puneeth Rajkumar (Kannada) lent their voices to the film.

The film won the 66th National Film Award for Best Investigative Film. The jury citation for the award reads - "For its gritty examination of why and how young girls are coerced into commercial sex work, destroying their lives and minds, and for depicting their courage to survive."

Voice artistes

External links

References

2018 short documentary films
Indian short documentary films
Indian multilingual films
2018 multilingual films